Care is the first full-length Shriekback album (and their second studio album after Tench), released in 1983.

The single "Lined Up" was a minor club hit and reached number 39 on the Australian ARIA charts. "Lined Up" was released twice in the UK (the second time as a remix), peaking at number 89 initially and number 78 for the remix. The album spent 3 weeks on the Billboard album chart, peaking at number 188.

Critical reception
Trouser Press called the album "an intelligent, well-produced, spirited debut, demonstrating what every XTC fan knew all along — [Barry] Andrews is one of rock’s most original and musical keyboard players."

Track listing 
All tracks written and composed by Dave Allen, Barry Andrews, Carl Marsh, except where noted.

UK version

"Lined Up" (Andrews) – 3:48
"Clear Trails" – 3:41
"Hapax Legomena" - 3:58
"Petulant" – 3:53
"Lines from the Library" – 3:38
"Brink of Collapse" – 4:08
"Sway" – 3:58
"Into Method" (Allen, Andrews, Caple, Marsh ) – 4:27
"Evaporation" (Andrews, Marsh) – 3:21
"In: Amongst" - 2:12

US version

"Lined Up" – 3:50
"Clear Trails" – 3:45
"Accretions" – 4:12
"My Spine (Is the Bassline)" – 4:01
"Into Method" (Allen, Andrews, Caple, Marsh) – 4:26
"Brink of Collapse" – 4:05
"Petulant" – 3:58
"Sway" – 3:55
"Lines from the Library" – 3:42
"Evaporation" – 3:20

Remastered edition, released by the band in 2014 in extremely limited quantities

"Lined Up"
"Clear Trails"
"Hapax Legomena"
"Petulant"
"Lines from the Library"
"Brink of Collapse"
"Sway"
"Into Method"
"Evaporation"
"In: Amongst"
"My Spine (Is the Bassline)"
"Speed of Clocks"
"Despite Dense Weed"
"Gated Joy"
"Working on the Ground"
"Tiny Birds"
"Feelers"
"Lined Up (Disco Mix)"

Personnel
Shreikback
Barry Andrews - keyboards, synthesizers, vocals
Carl Marsh - guitars, vocals
Dave Allen - bass
with:
Kirsty MacColl - backing vocals on "Lined Up"
Technical
Ian Caple- engineer, co-production

References 

 liner notes

1983 debut albums
Shriekback albums